Lojze Ude (June 18, 1896 in Križe, Tržič, Austria-Hungary – February 28, 1982 in Lošinj, Socialist Federal Republic of Yugoslavia) was Slovenian lawyer, journalist and historian.

Honours 
 Golden Obilić Medal (1920)
 Order of Merit with silvery rays (1951)
 Order of Brotherhood and Unity with silvery rays (1951)
 Order of the Red Flag (1956)
 Order of Merit with Silver Star (1968)
 Order of Valour (1972)
 Order of the Republic with golden wreath (1979)
 Drabosnjak's Prize (1966)
 Kidrič's Prize (1978).

Selected works 
 Koroški zbornik, Državna založba Slovenije, 1946
 Slovenci in jugoslovanska skupnost, Obzorja, 1972
 Koroško vprašanje, Drẑavna zaloẑba Slovenije, 1976
 Boj za severno slovensko mejo: 1918-1919, Založba obzorja, 1977

References

External links 
 Biography of Lojze Ude on the Slovenian Biographical Lexicon web site

20th-century Slovenian historians
Slovenian journalists
1896 births
1982 deaths
Austro-Hungarian military personnel
People from the Municipality of Tržič
20th-century journalists